Indian Lake is a hamlet located in the Town of Indian Lake in Hamilton County, New York, United States. Adirondack Lake is located northeast of the hamlet and Indian Lake is located south of the hamlet. NY 28 and NY 30 run through the hamlet.

Indian Lake has a post office with zip code 12842, located at 6316 State Highway 30. The Indian Lake Central School is located here at 28 West Main Street.

References

Hamlets in Hamilton County, New York
Hamlets in New York (state)